181 Fremont is an  mixed-use skyscraper in the South of Market District of San Francisco, California. The building, designed by Heller Manus Architects, is located adjacent to the Transbay Transit Center and 199 Fremont Street developments.  181 Fremont is owned and operated by Jay Paul Company. Jay Paul Company is the sole owner and developer of the project. The entire office portion of the building has been leased to Facebook to house its San Francisco office and Instagram division.

Design
The slender mixed-use tower, developed initially by SKS Investments, rises  to the roof with 55 floors of offices and residential condominiums.

The tower will contain  of office space on the lower 35 floors (from 3 to 38), and 67 condominiums on the upper 16 floors (from 41 to 57).  The 39th floor will contain residential amenities and a two-story open air terrace. Mechanical spaces would be on floors 2 and 40.  The building will have a direct connection to the rooftop park atop the adjacent Salesforce Transit Center from the 7th floor.

Upon completion, the tower was the tallest mixed-use building in San Francisco, surpassing the nearby Millennium Tower, and the 2nd-tallest in the Western United States. It was also the third tallest building in the city after the Transamerica Pyramid and the Salesforce Tower. 181 Fremont joins several other buildings designed to catalyze the San Francisco Transbay development area.

History
However, the developers reduced the height of the project to comply with the parcel's  height limit, as detailed in the Transbay Center District Plan approved in 2012. Still, this height limit is twice as high as the previous restriction. The tower's design was approved in December 2012, and the development site was subsequently put on the market by SKS Investments.

On March 29, 2013, Jay Paul Company announced that it acquired the development from SKS Investments and planned "to immediately commence construction" with completion expected in the second quarter of 2015. According to Bloomberg, the building will cost US$375 million to construct, including land acquisition costs.  Demolition of the existing structures began in August 2013, with tower construction expected to begin in November.  Official groundbreaking ceremonies took place on November 12, 2013, and the luxury residences were officially named Park 181.  The name was later changed to simply 181 Fremont Residences.  Jay Paul Company announced that the building would cost US$500 million to construct and is scheduled to open in early 2017.  On September 20, 2017, it was reported that Facebook would lease the entire office portion of the building to form a new San Francisco office.

See also

 San Francisco's tallest buildings

References

External links

 

Skyscrapers in San Francisco
Residential condominiums in San Francisco
South of Market, San Francisco